Mes Sungun Varzaghan Sports Club (Bāshgāh-e Varzeshi-e Mes-e Sungun-e Varzaqān) is an Iranian professional Sports club based in Tabriz.

Season to season

The table below chronicles the achievements of the Club in various competitions.

Last updated: 9 April 2022

Notes:
* unofficial titles
1 worst title in history of club

Key

P   = Played
W   = Games won
D   = Games drawn
L   = Games lost

GF  = Goals for
GA  = Goals against
Pts = Points
Pos = Final position

Honours

Domestic
 Iranian Futsal Super League
 Winners (4) – record: 2017–18, 2018–19, 2019–20, 2020–2021
 Runners-up (2): 2015–16, 2021–22

Continental
 AFC Futsal Club Championship
 Winners (1): 2018
 Runners-up (1): 2019

Individual
Top Goalscorer
 Iranian Futsal Super League:
 2014–15 Iranian Futsal Super League
  Moslem Rostamiha (26 goals)
 2019–20 Iranian Futsal Super League
  Mahdi Javid (34 goals)

Best player
 Iranian Futsal Super League
 2017–18 Iranian Futsal Super League
  Alireza Samimi (Best Goalkeeper)
Best Team
 Best Team of the 2017–18 Iranian Futsal Super League 
Best Manager
 2017–18 Iranian Futsal Super League –  Hamid Bigham

Players

Current squad

Notable players

Personnel

Current technical staff

Last updated: 17 October 2022

Club statistics and records

Statistics in super league
 Seasons in Iranian Futsal Super League: 8
 Best position in Iranian Futsal Super League: First (2017–18, 2018–19, 2019–20, 2020–21)
 Worst position in Iranian Futsal Super League: 3rd (2014–15, 2016–17)
 Most goals scored in a season: 126 (2019–20)
 Most goals scored in a match: 
 Most goals conceded in a match: 
 Top scorer: Farhad Fakhimzadeh with 98 goals

General statistics
 All-time most goals scored in a match:

Top goalscorers

See also 
 Mes Sungun Varzaghan Football Club

References

External links 
 

Futsal clubs in Iran
Sport in Tabriz
2010 establishments in Iran
Futsal clubs established in 2010